Sawan Gas Field is  located in Sindh, Pakistan. It is a joint venture of OMV Pakistan, ENI Pakistan, PPL, Moravské naftové doly and Government Holdings (Private) Limited.

Sawan was and still is one of the largest discoveries of gas reserves in Pakistan. 

The operator of the field is OMV Pakistan.

Sawan Gas Plant has its own airfield for transportation of staff due to its remote location. The airfield is known as Sawan Airport.

ENI announced in June 2020, amidst the COVID-19 pandemic, that it was putting its Pakistan assets up for sale.

See also 

 Kadanwari Gas Field

References

Natural gas fields in Pakistan